Muliro is an African surname. Notable people with the surname include:

Gloria Muliro (born 1980), Kenyan Gospel musician and songwriter
Masinde Muliro (1922–1992), Kenyan politician

Surnames of African origin